New Westminster Secondary School is a secondary school in New Westminster, British Columbia, Canada. It is one of the largest high schools in British Columbia. Enrollment of students is open to those within grades 9 through 12. The school is home to programs such as the International Baccalaureate program and a 1 year apprenticeship program. In 2007, the Fraser Institute ranked the school well within the top 50 secondary schools in British Columbia. This was out of the 279 public and private secondary schools operating in the province. 
The School is located in Metro Vancouver in BC's Lower Mainland region while the campus is centrally located within the region on the north side of the city of New Westminster. It encompasses an area of three city blocks by two city blocks.

History
Prior to the 1860s the site of the present school was a public cemetery where many of the prominent citizens of New Westminster were interred. Many of the citizens who were buried in this public cemetery were part of the Chinese community and as well as Sikhs and Indigenous. After development in the 1870s the remains of those buried were transferred to the Fraser Cemetery, located elsewhere in the city. During the Second World War the corner of 10th Avenue and 8th, where the present school is located, was leased to the Federal Government. The site served as a soldiers' barracks, used for training and housing the Royal Westminster Regiment. After World War II, the barracks were moved to the University of British Columbia and the rest of the cemetery was demolished. Finally, in 1948 The public works yard was moved and the site was transferred to the New Westminster School Board for the construction of offices and a new high school.

In September 1949 Vincent Massey Junior High was unofficially opened by Premier Bryan I. Johnson. On December 16, 1949, the school was officially opened. The school was named after the Right Honourable Vincent Massey, the eighteenth Governor General of Canada. The adjoining Pearson wing, named after the Right Honourable Lester Pearson, former Canadian Prime Minister, was home to the Senior High School prior to the two becoming amalgamated into the present New Westminster Secondary School.

Academics
The NWSS International Baccalaureate (IB) program is a pre-university course of studies, offered at NWSS since 2000. The school offers the Diploma Program (DP), the Certificate Program (CP), and an unofficial Pre-IB Programme. All of the programs require an exam entry, although exam entry into the Diploma and Certificate programs is not required if moving on from the Pre-IB Program. At NWSS, the Pre-IB Program prepares students for the rigors of the global IB Program by increasing the difficulty and workloads of the students. The Pre-IB Programme contains a course called RIM, or Research in Motion. This course is meant to give students a basis in discussion of ethics and technology useful in the diploma programme. It includes a research paper known as the Long Term Project (LTP), imitable of the 3000 word Extended Essay completed by Diploma candidates.

The school has an ESL program for students whose second language is English. This program is offered to many International Students. A French Immersion program includes classes purely taught in French. This is the continuation of the Glenbrook Middle School late French immersion program. In this program, students are expected to speak French in most classes and upon finishing it, have almost native fluency.

School facilities and resources

Sports teams
New Westminster Secondary School has more than 13 sports teams including:
 American Football (Junior Boys, Senior Boys)
 Soccer Team (Junior, Senior)
 Badminton (Junior, Senior)
 Volleyball (Juvenile, Junior, Senior)
 Basketball (Juvenile, Junior, Senior)
 Field Hockey Team (Girls)
 X-Country (Junior, Senior)
 Track and Field (Junior, Senior)
 Field Lacrosse (Junior, Senior)
 Wrestling (Juvenile, Junior, Senior)
 Tennis (Everyone)
 Golf (Everyone)
 Table Tennis (Everyone, all ages combined)

Future development
The New Westminster School District has announced the plans for the replacement of the New Westminster Secondary School (NWSS). NWSS will continue to be the biggest school in the Province of British Columbia with this largest and most complex construction project in the history of the province.

Minister of Education Mike Bernier came to New Westminster on Tuesday, June 7, 2016, to announce the long-awaited funding approval for the New Westminster Secondary School replacement project.  The $106.5 million replacement of New Westminster Secondary School will be completed near the end of the summer of 2020. This $106.5 million budget for the new school is the largest budget in BC history to be allocated to a school.  Upon its completion, the new school will be home for over 2100 grade 9 to 12 students.  The new school will be designed to meet today's standards for safety, accessibility and modern learning.

Notable alumni

Justin Morneau – Major League Baseball player of the Minnesota Twins, and MVP winner.
Bill Ranford – Professional National Hockey League player.
Todd Ewen – Professional National Hockey League player (1985–2000).
Peter Julian – Canadian Member of Parliament for the New Democratic Party
Ryu Sera – South Korean singer, and main vocalist of the group Nine Muses
Eva Markvoort – Miss New Westminster 2002

Filming location
New Westminster Secondary School was the main filming location for the five-season television series 21 Jump Street
New Westminster Secondary School is the main filming location for the videos used in the Premier Go Program
New Westminster Secondary School was the main filming location in 2015 for the short film That's So Straight

References

External links
New Westminster Secondary School Website

High schools in British Columbia
International Baccalaureate schools in British Columbia
Educational institutions established in 1960
Education in New Westminster
1960 establishments in British Columbia